Glyphostoma bertiniana is a species of sea snail, a marine gastropod mollusk in the family Clathurellidae.

Description
The shell is pink outside and inside. The canaliculate sutures are often black-banded, with frequently a white central band on the body whorl,
and a narrow black band below. The shell grows to a length of 12 mm.

Distribution
This marine species occurs along New Guinea.

References

bertiniana
Gastropods described in 1878